Juventus is the club that has contributed the most players to the Italy national team in history. They are the only Italian club that has contributed players to every Italy national teams since its first appearance at the 2nd FIFA World Cup. Juventus have contributed numerous players to Italy's World Cup campaigns.

Two Juventus players have won the golden boot and the golden ball award at the World Cup with Italy; Paolo Rossi in 1982 and Salvatore Schillaci in 1990.  As well as contributing to Italy's World Cup winning sides, Alfredo Foni and Pietro Rava represented Italy in the gold medal winning squad at the 1936 Summer Olympics, and Sandro Salvadore, Ernesto Castano and Giancarlo Bercellino made Italy's 1968 European Championship squad. In 2021, four Juventus players (captain Giorgio Chiellini, Federico Bernardeschi, Leonardo Bonucci and Federico Chiesa) won the UEFA Euro 2020.

List of call-ups of Juventus F.C. players to the Italy national team 
Below is a list of all Juventus F.C. players to have played for the senior national team (or Nazionale A in Italian) in official matches during their Juventus career, when Giovanni Giacone became the first Juventus player to play for the national team on 28 March 1920.

 Christian Abbiati
 Luigi Allemandi
 Amauri*
 Ugo Amoretti
 Pietro Anastasi
 Roberto Anzolin
 Alberto Aquilani
 Dino Baggio
 Roberto Baggio
 Andrea Barzagli
 Romeo Benetti
 Giancarlo Bercellino I (EC)
 Federico Bernardeschi (EC)
 Luigi Bertolini (WC) (CEIC)
 Alberto Bertuccelli
 Roberto Bettega
 Carlo Bigatto I
 Alessandro Birindelli
 Manuele Blasi
 Giampiero Boniperti
 Leonardo Bonucci (EC)
 Felice Borel II (WC) (CEIC)
 Matteo Brighi
 Antonio Bruna
 Gianluigi Buffon (WC)
 Antonio Cabrini (WC)
 Umberto Caligaris (WC) (CEIC)
 Mauro Camoranesi* (WC)
 Fabio Cannavaro (WC)
 Fabio Capello
 Massimo Carrera
 Pierluigi Casiraghi
 Ernesto Castano (EC)
 Franco Causio
 Sergio Cervato
 Renato Cesarini* (CEIC)

 Luigi Cevenini III (CEIC)
 Giorgio Chiellini (EC)
 Federico Chiesa (EC)
 Umberto Colombo
 Gianpiero Combi (WC) (CEIC)
 Antonio Conte
 Giuseppe Corradi
 Antonello Cuccureddu
 Giuseppe Damiani
 Luigi De Agostini
 Virginio De Paoli
 Mattia De Sciglio
 Alessandro Del Piero (WC)
 Teobaldo Depetrini
 Angelo Di Livio
 Marco Di Vaio
 Flavio Emoli
 Ciro Ferrara
 Giovanni Ferrari (WC) (CEIC)
 Rino Ferrario
 Pio Ferraris
 Alfredo Foni (O) (WC)
 Andrea Fortunato
 Giuseppe Furino
 Roberto Galìa
 Bruno Garzena
 Claudio Gentile (WC)
 Emanuele Giaccherini
 Giovanni Giacone
 Sebastian Giovinco
 Adolfo Gori
 Giuseppe Grabbi
 Fabio Grosso
 Vincenzo Iaquinta
 Filippo Inzaghi
 Mark Iuliano
 Moise Kean

 Nicola Legrottaglie
 Gianfranco Leoncini
 Manuel Locatelli
 Attilio Lombardo
 Sergio Manente
 Gian Pietro Marchetti
 Marco Marchionni
 Claudio Marchisio
 Giacomo Mari
 Giancarlo Marocchi
 Domenico Marocchino
 Rinaldo Martino
 Alessandro Matri
 Giampaolo Menichelli
 Fabrizio Miccoli
 Luis Monti* (WC) (CEIC)
 Antonio Montico
 Bruno Mora
 Francesco Morini
 Marco Motta
 Ermes Muccinelli
 Federico Munerati (CEIC)
 Bruno Nicolè
 Antonio Nocerino
 Angelo Ogbonna
 Raimundo Orsi* (WC) (CEIC)
 Dani Osvaldo*
 Michele Padovano
 Raffaele Palladino
 Carlo Parola
 Federico Peluso
 Simone Pepe
 Mattia Perin
 Angelo Peruzzi
 Gianluca Pessotto
 Alberto Piccinini
 Silvio Piola

 Andrea Pirlo
 Fabio Quagliarella
 Pietro Rava (O) (WC)
 Fabrizio Ravanelli
 Eduardo Ricagni *
 Virginio Rosetta (WC) (CEIC)
 Paolo Rossi (WC)
 Daniele Rugani
 Sandro Salvadore (EC)
 Benito Sarti
 Salvatore Schillaci
 Gaetano Scirea (WC)
 Lucidio Sentimenti IV
 Aldo Serena
 Omar Sívori *
 Leonardo Spinazzola
 Luciano Spinosi
 Pietro Serantoni
 Gino Stacchini
 Stefano Sturaro
 Alessio Tacchinardi
 Stefano Tacconi
 Marco Tardelli (WC)
 Moreno Torricelli
 Roberto Tricella
 Giovanni Varglien II
 Mario Varglien I (WC)
 Giuseppe Vavassori
 Giovanni Vecchina
 Gianluca Vialli
 Christian Vieri
 Giovanni Viola
 Pasquale Vivolo
 Gianluca Zambrotta (WC)
 Simone Zaza
 Gianfranco Zigoni
 Dino Zoff (WC)

Source:   
Legend:
 (WC) = FIFA World Cup winners during their careers at Juventus
 (EC) = European Football Championship winners during their careers at Juventus
 (O) Olympic football tournament winners during their careers at Juventus
 (CEIC) = Central European International Cup winners during their careers at Juventus
 (*) Oriundi footballers.

As of 11 July 2021.

Top 10 national team appearances for Juventus players
Not all appearances made for the national team by the players were made while they were under contract with Juventus.
Updated on 11 July 2021.

See also
Nazio-Juve
Blocco-Juve

Footnotes and references

Bibliography

External links 
 National team in figures: the call-ups to all Italy national football teams (Major, Olympic and Under) by clubs (research in the FIGC official website)

Juventus F.C.
Italy national football team